Today Is Christmas is the twelfth studio album and second Christmas album by American singer LeAnn Rimes. Released in 2015, it features holiday classics and two original songs co-written by Rimes. The album has sold 35,700 copies in the United States as of January 2016.

Track listing

Personnel

 Tariqha Akuni - acoustic guitar
 Rob Arthur - Hammond B-3 organ, upright piano
 Dave Audé - keyboards
 Ryan Bast - background vocals
 Aloe Blacc - vocals on "That Spirit of Christmas"
 Darrell Brown - keyboards, background vocals, producer, songwriter
 Vinnie Colaiuta - drums
 Jim Cox - upright piano
 Summer Davis - background vocals
 Tim Davis - background vocals
 Gavin DeGraw - vocals on "Celebrate Me Home"
 Ron Dzuibla - tenor saxophone, baritone saxophone
 Steve Ferrone - drums
 Bob Glaub - bass guitar
 James Gadson - drums
 Booker T. Jones - Hammond B-3 organ, Wurlitzer
 Suzie Katayama - string arrangements
 Nick Lane - trombone
 Deborah Lippmann - background vocals
 Ray Parker Jr. - electric guitar
 Steve Richards - cello
 LeAnn Rimes - lead vocals, background vocals, producer, songwriter
 Lee Thornburg - flugelhorn, trombone, trumpet, horn arrangements
 Willie Weeks - bass guitar

Celebrate Me Home

Celebrate Me Home promo single according to Mediabase radio charts reached #2 on the Holiday Radio Play chart and #7 on Adult Contemporary chart. The Video for Celebrate Me Home was created as a Facebook awareness video for Disabled American Veterans and proved to be a great success with over 5.6 million native views as of January 2016.

Chart performance

Weekly charts

Year-end charts

References

2015 Christmas albums
Albums produced by Niko Bolas
Albums produced by Darrell Brown (musician)
Albums produced by LeAnn Rimes
Christmas albums by American artists
Country Christmas albums
LeAnn Rimes albums